The Boeing XP3B-1 (company designation Model 466) was a proposed patrol aircraft, developed by Boeing for use by the United States Navy in the late 1940s. It was planned to be powered by two Allison T40 turboprops driving contra-rotating propellers, and utilized tandem landing gear. The project was cancelled before any aircraft were built.

Specifications

References

Citations

Bibliography

 Andrade, John. U.S. Military Aircraft Designations and Serials since 1909. Hinckley, UK: Midland Counties Publications, 1979. .
 Bowers, Peter M. Boeing Aircraft since 1916. London: Putnam, Third edition, 1989. .

P3B
Aircraft with contra-rotating propellers
Cancelled military aircraft projects of the United States
High-wing aircraft
Twin-turboprop tractor aircraft